The Nordland Fotballkrets (Nordland Football Association) is one of the 18 district organisations of the Norwegian Football Federation. It administers lower tier football in the traditional district of Helgeland and Salten.

Background 
Nordland Fotballkrets, is the governing body for football in the traditional district of Helgeland and Salten, which covers the southern and mid parts of Nordland county. The Association currently has 98 member clubs. Based in Bodø, the Association's chairman is Ernst Pedersen.

Affiliated Members 
The following 98 clubs are affiliated to the Nordland Fotballkrets:

Åga IL
Aldersund IL
Alstahaug IL
Bjerka IL
Bleikvassli IL
FK Bodø/Glimt
Bodø Internasjonale IK
Bodø Studentenes IL
Bossmo & Ytteren IL
Bro IL
Brønnøysund IL
Dalselv IL
Dønna IL
IL Drag
Drevja IL
Drevvatn IL
FK Fauske/Sprint
Finneid IL
Finneidfjord IL
FK Gevir Bodø
Glomfjord IL
IK Grand Bodø
Grane IL
Grønnåsen IL
Gruben IL
IL Halsakameratene
Halsøy IL
Hamarøy IL
Hattfjelldal IL
Hemnes IL
Herøy IL
FK Herøy/Dønna
Hilstad IL
Hulløy Bodø
Hunstad FK
Innstranda IL
IK Junkeren
Kongsvik IL
Korgen IL
Kråkegull SK
Kvarven UIL
Leirfjord IL
Lovund UIL
Lurøy FK
IL Malm
Meløy FK
Meløy UIL
Misvær IL
Mo IL
Mørkved SK
Mosjøen IL
Nedre Beiarn IL
Nedre Rønvik IL
Nesna IL
Neverdal UIL
Nordfjorden IL
Nordstranda IL
Olderskog IL
Ørnes IL
Radaasen FK
Rana FK
Reipå IL
Rødøy UIL
Røst IL
FK Saltdalskameratene
Saltstraumen IL
Sandnessjøen IL
Selfors UL
FK Silkefot
Skjerstad IL
Skonseng UL
SMIL Engavågen
Solværøyan UIL
Sømna IL
Sørfold FK
IL Splint
Sport-71 IK
Sport Torghatten IL
IL Stålkameratene
Steigen SK
Storforshei IF
Storjord Futsal (futsal)
Storm Bodø FK
IL Strandkameratene
Svartisen Futsal (futsal)
IL Tjalg
Tjongsfjord IL
Træna UIL
Tverlandet IL
Utskarpen IL
Valnesfjord IL
Værangfjord IL
Værøy IL
IL Vega
Vegakameratene
Vevelstad IL
Vinger IL
FK Vinkelen

League competitions 
Nordland Fotballkrets run the following league competitions:

Men's football
4. divisjon  -  one section
5. divisjon  -  one section
6. divisjon  -  two sections

Women's football
2. divisjon  -  one section

Footnotes

External links 

Nordland
Sport in Nordland